Oleg Grischkin (born 10 February 1975 in Moscow) is a former Russian racing cyclist.

Palmares

1997
1st Overall Five Rings of Moscow
1998
1st Trofeo Città di San Vendemiano
2002
1st  National Road Race Championships
1st Tallinn-Tartu GP
2nd Reading Classic
2003
1st Grand Prix de Rennes
1st Overall Tour of South China Sea
1st Stages 1, 4, 5 & 6
1st Stage 2 Tour de Beauce
2nd Reading Classic
2007
1st Stage 4b Tour de Beauce
3rd Reading Classic

References

1975 births
Living people
Russian male cyclists
Cyclists from Moscow
Cyclists at the 2004 Summer Olympics
Olympic cyclists of Russia